A list of films produced in Egypt in 1940. For an A-Z list of films currently on Wikipedia, see :Category:Egyptian films.

External links
 Egyptian films of 1940 at the Internet Movie Database
 Egyptian films of 1940 elCinema.com

Lists of Egyptian films by year
1940 in Egypt
Lists of 1940 films by country or language